Dar Tujan (also Romanized as Dar Tūjān) is a village in Shamil Rural District, Takht District, Bandar Abbas County, Hormozgan Province, Iran. At the 2006 census, its population was 213, in 67 families.

References 

Populated places in Bandar Abbas County